Plaani Külajärv is a lake is the southeast of Estonia in Rõuge Parish, Võru County, close to the border with Latvia.

See also
List of lakes of Estonia

Lakes of Estonia
Rõuge Parish
Lakes of Võru County